Agelena annulipedella is a species of spider in the family Agelenidae, which contains at least 1,350 species . It was first described by Strand in 1913. It is commonly found in central Africa.

References

annulipedella
Spiders of Africa
Spiders described in 1913